WEVV-TV (channel 44) is a television station in Evansville, Indiana, United States, affiliated with CBS, Fox, and MyNetworkTV. Owned by Allen Media Broadcasting, the station maintains studios on Carpenter and Bond Streets in downtown Evansville and a transmitter at John James Audubon State Park in Henderson, Kentucky.

WEEV-LD (channel 47) in Evansville operates as a low-power translator of WEVV-TV, relaying the Fox and MyNetworkTV programming shown on WEVV-DT2; this station's transmitter is located on Wolf Hills Road in Henderson along the Ohio River.

History

Early history
Channel 44 first signed on the air on November 17, 1983, as an independent station. The station was originally owned by Ralph Wilson (owner of San Francisco independent station KICU-TV, and founder of the Buffalo Bills). It was the first full-market independent station in the Tri-State, and the first full-market commercial television station to sign on in the Evansville market since WTVW (channel 7, now a CW affiliate) debuted 27 years earlier in August 1956.

Competing independent station WLCN (channel 19, later WAZE-TV and now defunct)—which signed one month after WEVV began operations—primarily served the southern part of the market at the time. The station originally operated from studio facilities located on Main Street and Riverside Drive in downtown Evansville.

As a Fox affiliate
The station became an affiliate of the Fox Broadcasting Company on April 5, 1987, when the network debuted its inaugural lineup of prime time programming, which aired on Sunday evenings. However, like other Fox stations during the network's early years, WEVV continued to be programmed as a de facto independent station, as Fox would not carry seven nights a week of programming until September 1993.

Until Fox began airing programming on a nightly basis, WEVV aired movies on nights when network programs did not air, usually starting at 7:00 p.m. Shortly after affiliating with the network, the station began branding as "Fox 44". The station changed its branding to "WEVV Fox TV" in 1994.

CBS affiliation
In May 1995, Banam Broadcasting, a subsidiary of BankAmerica, sold WTVW to Petracom Broadcasting. Fox then acquired a 20% equity stake in Petracom; this led to a three-way affiliation swap in which WTVW ended its affiliation with ABC after 39 years and joined Fox on December 3, 1995. Conversely, the ABC affiliation moved to WEHT (channel 25) ending that station's affiliation with CBS.

On July 1, 1995, WEVV signed an affiliation agreement with CBS to become the network's new affiliate for the Evansville market. Although CBS' affiliation agreement with WEHT did not expire until December of that year, channel 25 (which was unhappy about losing its network affiliation with CBS after 42 years) began dropping CBS shows from its schedule in stages. As a result, CBS' programming gradually migrated to WEVV over the next four months, during which the station carried both CBS and Fox programming. The Price Is Right was the first CBS program to move to channel 44 on September 18, 1995. WEVV then picked up CBS This Morning in November. The switch to CBS was officially completed on December 3, when the remainder of the CBS programming schedule moved to WEVV. At that point, the station sold much of its syndicated programming inventory to WTSN-LP (channel 56, now Retro Television Network affiliate WYYW-CD on channel 15).

On February 11, 1999, Wilson sold the station to Communications Corporation of America for $27.5 million. In June 2006, Comcorp filed for Chapter 11 bankruptcy protection in the Western District of Louisiana. That September, WEVV began broadcasting a digital high-definition signal; at the time, a digital subchannel was added on virtual channel 44.2, which was originally affiliated solely with MyNetworkTV and was simulcast on WTSN-LP (and as such, was branded as "MyTSN"). The station's relationship with WTSN-LP ended in 2009, at which time WEVV-DT2 rebranded as "My44", with WTSN converting into an America One affiliate.

WEVV-TV discontinued regular programming on its analog signal, over UHF channel 44, on June 12, 2009, the official date in which full-power television stations in the United States transitioned from analog to digital broadcasts under federal mandate. The station's digital signal remained on its pre-transition UHF channel 45, using PSIP to display the station's virtual channel as its former UHF analog channel 44.

On May 11, 2011, WEVV signed an affiliation agreement with Fox on its second digital channel after WTVW (which then became an independent station) lost its affiliation due to a dispute between Fox and Nexstar over Fox's revenue sharing demands of its stations' retransmission consent earnings—in essence, resulting in WEVV regaining the Fox affiliation it had lost 16 years earlier. WEVV added Fox programming to its second digital subchannel on July 1, 2011 on WEVV digital channel 44.2. Consequently, MyNetworkTV programming—which had been carried on the subchannel since it launched with the programming service on September 5, 2006—was moved from the 7:00 to 9:00 p.m. to 9:00 to 11:00 p.m., immediately following Fox programming. On June 24, 2011, WEVV-TV signed on a new digital low-power translator station on UHF channel 47, under the callsign W47EE-D, to relay WEVV-DT2's programming in 720p high definition over-the-air in the immediate Evansville/Henderson area. and to provide an HD signal of the subchannel to local cable and satellite providers.

Bayou City Broadcasting ownership
On April 24, 2013, Communications Corporation of America announced the sale of its stations to WEHT owner and WTVW operator Nexstar Broadcasting Group for $270 million, in a deal that also included rights to the local marketing agreements involving stations owned by Comcorp partner company White Knight Broadcasting. Since there are fewer than eight full-power stations in the Evansville market, neither Nexstar nor its partner company (and WTVW owner) Mission Broadcasting could legally buy WEVV. Instead, Nexstar originally opted to sell WEVV to Rocky Creek Communications, a Denton, Texas–based company founded by Shirley Green; Nexstar would have operated the station under a shared services agreement (SSA), which would have formed a virtual triopoly with WEHT and WTVW. However, the deal came soon after the FCC began closely scrutinizing sharing agreements between two or more television stations within the same market to help increase female and ethnic minority ownership in television broadcasting. When it was apparent the Comcorp sale would be delayed, Nexstar announced on August 4, 2014 that it would instead sell WEVV to The Woodlands, Texas–based Bayou City Broadcasting (owned by DuJuan McCoy, who is African American) for $18.6 million; the sale price later increased to $26.85 million by its closure. The sale was completed on January 1, 2015.

On January 8, 2015, WEVV and WEVV-DT2 were removed from Dish Network in the Evansville market, due to a carriage dispute spurred by Bayou City and Dish's inability to agree on retransmission consent revenue during negotiations on a new carriage agreement. Bayou City representatives claimed that Dish was trying to gain leverage over the company in negotiations because of the company's smaller size in comparison to other television station groups. Dish, however, claimed the new owners wanted transmission fees higher than those it pays other local broadcasters. The dispute was resolved on February 3, 2015, through the reaching of a multi-year carriage agreement with Dish Network.

On August 3, 2015, upon the relaunch of its news department, WEVV moved its operations to WTVW's former studios on Carpenter Street in Downtown Evansville, which had sat vacant since WTVW merged operations with WEHT through a shared services agreement in December 2011. On November 11, 2015, the translator's callsign was changed to the current WEEV-LD.

On May 6, 2019, it was announced that Los Angeles–based Entertainment Studios, headed by entertainment entrepreneur Byron Allen, would purchase the Bayou City stations (including WEVV-TV) for $165 million. The sale was completed on July 31, 2019.

News operation
WEVV started producing a 9:00 p.m. newscast February 23, 1992 as a Fox affiliate. Once it became a CBS affiliate in 1995, it moved the newscast to 10:00 p.m. and added additional newscasts. However, none of the changes to its newscasts helped the station in the ratings, and WEVV remained continually in fourth place behind WFIE, WEHT and WTVW. Unable to make any ratings headway, WEVV shut down its news department in July 2001, causing the layoffs of 40 staffers. As a result of the shutdown of the original news department, WEVV became one of the few Big Three affiliates that did not air any local newscasts—a group that includes CBS owned-and-operated station WWJ-TV in Detroit, ABC affiliate KDNL-TV in St. Louis and NBC affiliate WTWC-TV in Tallahassee, Florida. In 2002, the station began airing local weather cut-ins on weekday evenings, which were produced by WeatherVision out of its headquarters in Jackson, Mississippi.

After Bayou City Broadcasting acquired WEVV, Bayou City president DuJuan McCoy announced on December 9, 2014, that the company planned to relaunch a news department in 2015. The newscasts premiered on August 3, 2015, with the debuts of a new weekday morning news program (initially airing from 4:30 to 7:00 a.m., and is also simulcast on WEVV-DT2/WEEV-LD), a 90-minute news block starting at 5:00 p.m. and half-hour newscasts at noon and 10:00 p.m. on its main channel, which have all been produced in high definition since the return of in-house news operations. In addition to producing local newscasts for its main feed, WEVV also produces separate weekday morning and nightly 9:00 p.m. newscasts for its Fox/MyNetworkTV subchannel. Unlike most CBS affiliates, WEVV carries only a late-evening newscast at 10:00 p.m. on Saturdays and Sundays (with an hour-long weekend newscast at 9:00 p.m. for WEVV-DT2/WEEV-LD) as it did not produce an early-evening or weekend morning newscast at launch.

Notable former on-air staff
 Adam Alexander (now at Fox NASCAR)
 Ryan Owens (now correspondent with ABC News)

Technical information

Subchannels
The station's digital signal is multiplexed:

Ever since its inception, the WEVV-DT2 subchannel had been airing in 16:9 widescreen standard definition, and its high definition simulcast was exclusive to low-power WEEV-LD, which meant that Fox programming in HD had only been available on cable and satellite outside the immediate Evansville area; however, since an upgrade to their multiplexer equipment sometime in January 2020, the WEVV-DT2 subchannel has been broadcasting in 1080i full HD over-the-air (rather than the 720p format of most other Fox affiliates).

References

External links

CBS network affiliates
Television channels and stations established in 1983
EVV-TV
1983 establishments in Indiana
Entertainment Studios